'''Stephen Dormer camogie manager, winner of a manager of the year award in 2007 jointly with Liam Dunne and Stellah Sinnott. His sister Collette Dormer was an All Ireland finalist in 2009.

References

Camogie managers
Living people
Year of birth missing (living people)